Irwinia is the scientific name of two genera of organisms and may refer to:

Irwinia (fly), a genus of flies in the family Tachinidae, now treated as a taxonomic synonym of Phytomyptera
Irwinia (plant), a genus of plants in the family Asteraceae